Blunt is a common surname of English derivation, meaning "blonde, fair" (Old French blund), or "dull" (Middle English blunt, blont).  A variant spelling is Blount.

Notable people sharing the surname "Blunt" 
 Lady Anne Blunt (1837–1917), English horsebreeder; wife of Wilfrid Scawen Blunt
 Anthony Blunt (1907–1983), English art historian and Soviet spy
 Charles Blunt (born 1951), leader of the National Party of Australia
 Christopher Evelyn Blunt (1904–1987), British merchant banker and numismatist
 Crispin Blunt (born 1961), English Conservative MP for Reigate
 Dean Blunt, British musician, record producer, singer-songwriter, director, and conceptual artist
 E. A. H. Blunt, administrator and writer of the British Raj
 Edmund March Blunt (1770–1862), American navigator and magazine publisher
 Emily Blunt (born 1983), British American actress
 Giles Blunt (born 1952), Canadian author
 Henry Blunt (priest) (1794–1843), English Anglican evangelical cleric
 Henry Blunt (chemist) (1806–1853), English chemist and painter
 James Blunt (born 1974), British musician
 James G. Blunt (1826–1881), Union General in the American Civil War
 John Henry Blunt (1823–1884), English divine
 John James Blunt, (1794–1855), English religious scholar
 Joseph Blunt (1792–1860), American lawyer, author, editor and politician from New York
 Judy Blunt (born 1954), American Writer from Montana
 Leroy Blunt (1921–2016), American politician
 Matt Blunt (born 1970), governor of Missouri
 N. Bowditch Blunt (1804–1854), American lawyer and politician from New York
 Roger Blunt (1900–1966), New Zealand Test cricketer
 Roy Blunt (born 1950), US Senator from Missouri, former House Majority Whip and interim House Majority Leader
 Russell Blunt (1908–2004), notable North Carolina track and field coach
 Shannon Blunt, American engineer
 Simon F. Blunt (1818–1854) American Sailor, Cartographer, and Ship Captain
 Wilfrid Scawen Blunt (1840–1922), English poet and writer
 Wilfrid Jasper Walter Blunt (1901–1987), English art teacher, artist, author and curator

Fictional characters 
 Alan Blunt, a fictional character from the Alex Rider novel series by Anthony Horowitz
 Arno Blunt, a fictional character in the book Artemis Fowl: The Eternity Code by Eoin Colfer
 Sir Hubert Blunt, a character in the 1980s animated television series Dragon's Lair

See also
 Blount (surname)
 Blunt (disambiguation)

References